Erin Constance-Maja Darke is an American actress. She is known for her role as Cindy in the TV series Good Girls Revolt. She also plays Mary in The Marvelous Mrs. Maisel and Leeta in the AMC series Dietland. She has appeared in the films Love & Mercy (2014), Beside Still Waters (2014), Still Alice (2014), and Don't Think Twice (2016).

Personal life
Darke has been in a relationship with English actor Daniel Radcliffe since 2012, after the two had met on the set of the film Kill Your Darlings.

Filmography

Film

Television

References

External links

People from Flint, Michigan
Actresses from Michigan
21st-century American actresses
Living people
American film actresses
American television actresses
University of Michigan alumni
Year of birth missing (living people)